Park Sung-je (born 3 August 1988) is a Korean ice hockey goaltender. He is currently a free agent having last played for Gangwon High1 in Asia League Ice Hockey.

Park previously played for Anyang Halla and Daemyung Sangmu. He played his first regular season game on October 31, 2010.

He represented the South Korea men's national ice hockey team at the 2018 Winter Olympics.

References

External links

1988 births
HL Anyang players
Asian Games silver medalists for South Korea
Asian Games bronze medalists for South Korea
Asian Games medalists in ice hockey
High1 players
Ice hockey players at the 2011 Asian Winter Games
Ice hockey players at the 2017 Asian Winter Games
Ice hockey players at the 2018 Winter Olympics
Living people
Medalists at the 2011 Asian Winter Games
Medalists at the 2017 Asian Winter Games
Olympic ice hockey players of South Korea
South Korean ice hockey goaltenders